Steele Barracks may refer to:

 CFB Edmonton, a Canadian Forces base in Edmonton, Alberta, Canada, that is also known as "Steele Barracks"
 Steele Barracks (Moorebank), an Australian Army barracks in New South Wales, Australia